Jan Karol Opaliński (1642 – 26 March 1695), known as Henri Opaliński in France, was a Polish starost and kasztelan of Poznań.  He was the son of  Krzysztof Opaliński and Teresa Konstancya Czarnkowska.

Marriage and issue 
In December 1678, he married Zofia Anna Czarnkowska and had issue, only one of whom survived infancy.
 Maria Opalińska (August 1679-October 1679)
 Katarzyna, Queen of Poland (1680–1743)
 Stillborn child (1681)
 Stanislas Opaliński (1682-1682)

Katarzyna went on to marry Stanisław Leszczyński, the King of Poland and Duke of Lorraine.

Ancestors

References

1642 births
1695 deaths
Jan Karol
17th-century Polish people